Unakkaga Mattum is a 2000 Tamil language drama film directed by Chinni Jayanth, making his directorial debut. The film stars himself, newcomer Adhithya, newcomer Poonam and Ramji. The film, produced by Jayasree Narayanan, had music composed by newcomer Bobby Shankar, Shankar's son (of the duo Shankar–Ganesh) and was released in 2000 to negative reviews.

Plot

Subramani (Adhitya), a timid and rich Brahmin boy, falls in love with Lakshmi (Poonam), a poor girl. Raja (Chinni Jayanth), a rich drunkard, joins the college. Raja falls for Lakshmi but later withdraws, and he is content to remain her good friend. Subramani begins to suspect the relationship between Raja and Lakshmi. Subramani becomes a drunkard, although Raja stops drinking alcohol.

Cast

Chinni Jayanth as Raja
Adhitya as Subramani
Poonam as Lakshmi
Ramji as Guru
Vinu Chakravarthy  
Pandu as a professor
Laxmi Rathan as Subramani's father
Sathyapriya as Lakshmi's mother
Kavitha
Shanthi Williams as Mangalam, Subramani's mother
Singamuthu
Omakuchi Narasimhan
Sukran
Badava Gopi
Bosskey as Coconut seller

Production
The film's lead actor, Adithya, made his acting debut in the film. Originally from Punjab, Adithya is the nephew of the choreographer, Chopra of Hindi films, and the son of the winner of the Miss India 1972 pageant.

Awards
The film has won the following awards since its release :

2000 Film Fans Association
 Won - Commendation award - Chinni Jayanth

Soundtrack

The soundtrack was composed by Bobby Shankar. The soundtrack, released in 2000, features 6 tracks with lyrics written by Pulamaipithan and Kavi Varma.

Reception
BBThots wrote "The movie is an amazing combination of bad direction, characterization and dialogs". Chennai Online wrote "Insipid direction, weakly etched characters and lacklustre narration characterises the film".

References

2000 films
2000s Tamil-language films
2000 directorial debut films
Films scored by Devendran